The Fixer is a young adult mystery novel series by Jennifer Lynn Barnes, published by Bloomsbury Children's Books. The series consists of two books: The Fixer (2015) and The Long Game (2016).

The Fixer 
The Fixer was published July 7, 2015. The book received positive reviews from School Library Journal and Booklist, as well as a mixed review from Kirkus.

In 2018, the book was nominated for the South Carolina Book Award for Young Adult and the Missouri Truman Readers Award.

The Long Game 
The Long Game was published June 7, 2016. The book received a positive review from Booklist, as well as a mixed review from Kirkus.

References 

Young adult novel series
Bloomsbury Publishing books
Book series introduced in 2015